The Hope Chapel is a Strict Baptist place of worship in the town of Horsham in the English county of West Sussex. The chapel was built in 1903.

Horsham's second Strict Baptist chapel had its origins in meetings in a public hall in March 1900. The congregation moved several times, but on 2 December 1903 their new red-brick square-windowed chapel on Oakhill Road was inaugurated, and worship has continued there ever since. The three founders were from Kent.

See also
 List of places of worship in Horsham (district)
 List of Strict Baptist churches

References

Churches completed in 1903
20th-century Baptist churches in the United Kingdom
Strict Baptist chapels
Baptist churches in West Sussex
Horsham